Otto Vernon Darbishire (16 March 1870 – 17 October 1934) was a British botanist who specialised in marine algae and lichens. Born in Conwy (Caernarfonshire, Wales), he was educated at several places and eventually graduated from the University of Oxford.

Darbishire became a lecturer in botany at several institutions. First in Kiel University in 1897, where he earned a PhD; during this time he was an assistant to Johannes Reinke, professor of botany. He was later lecturer at Manchester University from 1898 to 1909; Armstrong College; Newcastle University from 1909 to 1911; and then Bristol University. At Bristol he was the first Melville Wills Professor of Botany, from the years 1919 to 1934. Darbishire was elected Fellow of the Linnean Society in 1920, and was president of the British Mycological Society in 1923.

Selected publications
Darbishire, O.V. (1898). Monographia Roccelleorum. Bibliotheca Bot. 45: 1–103.
Darbishire, O.V. (1912). The lichens of the Swedish Antarctic Expedition. Wissensch. Ergebn. Schwed. Südpolar-Exped. 1901-1903 4 (2): 1–73.
Darbishire, O.V. (1914). Some remarks on the ecology of lichens. Journal of Ecology 2: 71–82.
Darbishire, O.V. (1914). The development of the apothecium in the lichen Peltigera. Rep. British Ass. Adv. Sci., Birmingham 1913. 713–714.
Darbishire, O.V. (1923). Cryptogams from the Antarctic. Journal of Botany 61: 105–107.
Darbishire, O.V. (1923). Lichens in British Antarctic Expedition, 1910. Natur. Hist. Report, Botany 3: 29–76.
Darbishire, O.V. (1924). Some aspects of lichenology. Transactions of the British Mycological Society 10 (1–2): 10–28.
Darbishire, O.V. (1926). The structure of Peltigera with especial reference to P. praetextata. Annals of Botany 40: 727–758.
Darbishire, O.V. (1927). Über das Wachstum der Cephalodiem von Peltigera aphthosa L. Berichte der Deutschen Botanischen Gesellschaft 45: 221–228.
Darbishire, O.V. (1927). The soredia of Peltigera erumpens Wain, and P. scutata Kbr. Transactions of the British Mycological Society 12 (1): 52–70.

See also
 :Category:Taxa named by Otto Vernon Darbishire

References

1870 births
1934 deaths
British botanists
British lichenologists
British phycologists
Fellows of the Linnean Society of London
People from Conwy
University of Kiel alumni
Alumni of the University of Oxford